Multimedia University, abbreviated as MMU, is the oldest and first ever full-fledged private research university in Malaysia and a government-linked university as it is owned by Telekom Malaysia. It was founded in 1997, so it is considered a young medium university with a concentration in technology and multimedia disciplines. The university hosts ten faculties and Institute of Postgraduate Studies. Ministry of Education Malaysia classified this university as very competitive (Refer to Recognition and Achievements).

History
In 1994, Telekom Malaysia Berhad (TM), established the Institute of Telecommunication and Information Technology (ITTM) in Taiping, Perak. The first campus was established on TM's former northern region office where the first batch of 42 students were selected to undergo an experimental two-year telecommunication engineering diploma program. In 1996, with the academic success of the first two batches, TM was invited by the Ministry of Education to set up the first private university in Malaysia. ITTM was granted university status and renamed itself to Universiti Telekom.

In 1997, The Malacca campus was set up in the Ayer Keroh town. The setting up of the campus involved redeveloping and repurposing of the former TM southern region office. TM was offered by the Government of Malaysia to establish a university in MSC Malaysia (abbreviation of Multimedia Super Corridor) to catalyse the MSC program. A campus was set up in Cyberjaya and opened on 8 July 1999. The relationship between the Cyberjaya campus and the MSC is intended to be similar to the relationship between Stanford University and Silicon Valley. As a result, the university changed its name from Universiti Telekom to Multimedia University.

In 2013, MMU established a third campus in Iskandar Puteri, Johor, specializing in cinematic arts in collaboration with the University of Southern California. In 2021, the cinematics arts programmes were relocated to Cyberjaya to further complement the creative arts ecosystem in Cyberjaya and is known as Faculty of Creative Art. Faculty of Creative Art now is located in FCM building.

Recognition and achievements
Since its establishment MMU has received many recognitions and achievements. The Malaysian government – through the Malaysian Qualifications Agency under the Ministry of Higher Education (MoHE) has granted MMU Self-Accreditation status, formally acknowledging that the university is a trustworthy institution, whose programmes continuously meet or exceed strict specifications.

MMU has been accorded the status of a Premier Digital Tech University. by the Malaysian government, via MoHE, and is now officially recognised as one of the best places in the country to pursue computer and technology-related programmes. In addition, MDEC's Malaysia Digital Talent Study 2017 Final Findings by Frost and Sullivan has revealed that MMU graduates are most preferred by IT industries in Malaysia. As a result of the university growing from strength to strength, the MMU brand has grown in prominence. In 2019, MMU was awarded with the Superbrand status, in addition to winning the silver medal in the Putra Brands Award 2019, under the Education and Learning category.

In 2020, MMU was awarded the 5 Stars in SETARA 2019 (Very Competitive). SETARA is a ranking/rating carried out by the Ministry of Education Malaysia to assess Malaysia's universities and colleges in teaching, research, and service.

Faculties

Computing and informatics
MMU began with a single computing faculty known as the Faculty of Information Technology (FIT) in 1997. After the establishment of the Cyberjaya campus in 1999, FIT was split into the Faculty of Information Science and Technology (FIST) based in the Ayer Keroh campus, and Faculty of Computing & Informatics (FCI), the grey building next to FOM, based in the Cyberjaya campus. FIST offers undergraduate programs with majors in data communications and networking, security technology, artificial intelligence, business intelligence & analytics and bioinformatics. The undergraduate programs in FCI offers specialisations in software engineering, data science, cybersecurity and game development. In 2000, The Microsoft IT Academy of Multimedia University founded by Microsoft for training and development programs, including a Windows DNA lab during a visit by Bill Gates to endorse high-tech hub in Cyberjaya. The Faculty has strong collaborations with multi-national companies such as ZTE, Huawei, Nokia, Intel, Microsoft (Microsoft IT Academy), Cisco (Cisco Networking Academy), Motorola, Oracle Workforce Development Program, Novell Academic Training Partner, Linux Professional Institute and EC-Council. Almost all lecturers and tutors of undergraduate courses in this department have PhD degrees with few exceptions for highly experienced lecturers in their field.

Business and management 
The Faculty of Business (FOB) is based in Malacca. It offers programmes in knowledge management, marketing management, international business, human resource management, banking & finance, and accounting. The Faculty of Management (FOM), based in the Cyberjaya campus, offers programmes in accounting, financial engineering, finance, marketing, management, and economics.

Engineering and technology 
The Faculty of Engineering (FOE) is based in Cyberjaya. It offers bachelor's degrees accredited by the Washington Accord in electrical, electronics, computer, telecommunications, nanotechnology, and optical engineering. The Faculty of Engineering and Technology (FET), based in Malacca offers courses in electronics and mechanical engineering. The majors offered by the FET Electronics Engineering courses are robotics & automation, and telecommunications. All engineering courses in Malacca are also accredited by the Washington Accord.

Creative multimedia and cinematic arts 
The Faculty of Creative Multimedia (FCM), based in the Cyberjaya was established in 1999. Prior to that, it was based in the Malacca campus and known as the Faculty of Media Arts and Science. The Cyberjaya campus offers programs in animation and visual effects, advertising design, media arts, virtual reality, and interface design. The Johor campus was established in 2013 to offer the cinematic arts program, which was designed in collaboration with the University of Southern California. The Faculty of Cinematic Arts was later established and relocated to the Cyberjaya campus.

Law 
The Faculty of Law (FOL) is based in Malacca. The university's law programme was formerly a part of the business faculty, then known as the Faculty of Business and Law, before establishing as its own independent faculty in 2013. FOL students are fully exempted from taking the CLP examination.

Strategic communication 
The Faculty of Applied Communication (FAC) was established in 2016 from its origin as the Learning Institute for Empowerment (LiFE). It currently houses three programmes: Foundation in Communication, Diploma in Applied Communication and Bachelor of Communication (Strategic Communication). FAC underscores the discipline of communication which integrates both theoretical knowledge and real-life practices to enhance human communication.

Facilities

The university is equipped with facilities such as ASTRO lab (FCM), SiRi lab (FOM), Innov8 Lab (FCI), Ideas lab (FOE), E Moot Court (FOL ), SMART Intelligent Lab (FIST), Bio Informatics Lab (FIST), iBiz Lab (FOB) and iTrade Lab (FOB) as well as numerous computer and specialist labs. There is a 200-capacity industry-grade cinema, sound stage and recording studio, audio studio, foley studio (sound effects), motion capture studio, e-Gallery for exhibitions, VR laboratory and indoor/outdoor aquaponics farms.

The university has collaborated with industry to set up the HyFlex and HySpace teaching spaces that enable fully-immersible hybrid teaching and learning in which participants in the class as well as those online are able to interact seamlessly with the lecturer and fellow students.

Both campuses provide accommodation both on-campus and off-campus, as well as digital libraries and extensive infrastructure such campus-wide Wi-Fi, health clinics, 24-hour security, food and beverage outlets and more. Other available facilities are comprehensive sports centre – track & field, indoor sports arena, gym, tennis court, squash courts as well as an Olympic-sized swimming pool.

Rankings
Multimedia University was ranked amongst the top 151-200 universities worldwide by QS World University Rankings in the subject of computer science and electrical engineering between 2014 and 2017 consecutively. 92% of its total students were undergraduates.

In 2020, MMU is also ranked as one of the top ten Malaysian universities in Times Higher Education (THE) World University Rankings. It was listed as Top 2 in the field of Computer Science and Top 3 in Engineering & Technology, and Business & Economics among Malaysian private universities.

Partner institutions
 University of Southern California, United States
 Politecnico di Torino, Italy
 Kyushu Institute of Technology, Japan
 Korea National University of Transportation, South Korea
 Yonsei University, South Korea
 Ecole Polytechnique Federale De Lausanne (EPFL), Switzerland
 Tsinghua University, China
 Hong Kong University of Science & Technology, Hong Kong
 National University of Singapore, Singapore
 Télécom SudParis, France
 University College London, United Kingdom
 Technical University of Munich, Germany
 Hull University Business School, United Kingdom
 University of Southern Queensland, Australia
 Western Sydney University, Australia
 Auckland University of Technology, New Zealand
 Sharif University of Technology, Iran
 University of Illinois, United States
 Firebird Institute of Research in Management, India
 Birla Global University, India
 Kanagawa University, Japan
 Silpakorn University, Thailand
 Universitas Mercu Buana, Indonesia
 Universitas Telkom Bandung, Indonesia
 Institut Teknologi Bandung, Indonesia
 Universitas Pertamina, Indonesia
 Universitas Islam Indonesia, Indonesia

References

External links

 

 
Business schools in Malaysia
Design schools in Malaysia
Engineering universities and colleges in Malaysia
Film schools in Malaysia
Information technology schools in Malaysia
Law schools in Malaysia
Universities and colleges in Johor
Universities and colleges in Malacca
Universities and colleges in Selangor
Educational institutions established in 1994
1994 establishments in Malaysia
MSC Malaysia
TM Group of Companies
Private universities and colleges in Malaysia
Sepang District